Roland Tual (10 November 1902 – 29 August 1956) was a French director and producer.

First married to Colette Jéramec, the daughter of a rich Parisian industrialist, Tual then married the producer and director Denise Piazza, also known under the name Denise Tual.

Very close to  surrealists, he was a friend of the painter André Masson in the 1920s.

He had financial interests in the daily Le Monde.

Filmography 
Unit production manager
1932: Fantômas by Pál Fejös
1938: Mollenard by Robert Siodmak
1938: La bête humaine by Jean Renoir
1939: La Loi du nord by Jacques Feyder
1941: Remorques by Jean Grémillon
1945: Espoir by André Malraux and  based on the work by Malraux

Producer
1941: The Pavilion Burns  by Jacques de Baroncelli
1942: Lettres d'amour by Claude Autant-Lara 
1945: L'Espoir by André Malraux and Boris Peskine based on the work by Malraux
1950: Ce siècle a cinquante ans by Roland Tual, Denise Tual and  

Director
1942: Le Lit à colonnes
1944: Bonsoir mesdames, bonsoir messieurs	
1950: Ce siècle a cinquante ans by Roland Tual, Denise Tual and Werner Malbran

Art director
1932: Fanny by Marc Allégret

References

External links 

 lesgensducinema.com
 Filmographie partielle sur Dvdtoile
 Roland Tual (1904-1956) on André Breton.fr
 Tual Roland
 Portrait de Roand Tual on Centre Georges Pompidou

French producers
French directors
1902 births
Artists from Paris
1956 deaths